Angst is the seventh studio album by German industrial band KMFDM, released on October 13, 1993 by Wax Trax! Records.

Background
Bandmates Sascha Konietzko and En Esch began working together again after splitting up during the recording of their previous album, Money. Konietzko had moved to Seattle in 1993, while Esch had moved to New Orleans, Louisiana. Angst was the first album the band recorded in America with new engineer Chris Shepard, after recording their first six albums in Hamburg, the previous four of which had all been engineered by Blank Fontana. Angst also marked the first appearance of steel guitarist Mark Durante, whose presence made a noticeable impact on the band's sound, moving it towards a more guitar-driven style. Dutch vocalist Dorona Alberti made her mark on the album as well, singing on half the songs, including lead vocals on "The Problem".

Production
After very limited participation on Money, Esch had a much stronger hand in the songwriting and recording of Angst, and commented after its release, "We've tried to involve guitar players, we tried to be like a real band, especially in the creative kind of aspect."

Release
Angst was released on 13 October 1993. Unlike previous albums, Angst had a more rock-oriented sound, so the marketing strategy of Wax Trax!/TVT changed. TVT director of sales and marketing Paul Burgess said, "We decided to work them not like a typical dance-rock artist, but like a serious rock band, and it has crossed over to metal and commercial alternative this time." KMFDM embarked on the Angstfest Tour in support of the album in April and May 1994. In addition to the studio lineup, guitarist Mike Jensen was brought along for the live shows to duplicate the heavy sound of the album. This led to stage performances that included up to four guitarists playing at once.

The album had sold 20,000 copies by February 1994, and went on to sell more than 100,000 copies by October 1995. A digitally remastered reissue of Angst was released by Metropolis Records on 21 November 2006.

Reception

Andy Hinds of Allmusic said KMFDM had reached their full potential on the album. He called "A Drug Against War" "the band's most over-the-top moment to date" and thought "Sucks" was funny and irreverent. He concluded by calling Angst a great album for KMFDM newcomers. Ira Robbins called Angst "the fulfillment of Money's promise, a meld of pop choruses, metal guitar riffs and industrial machine-beats". Colin Larkin said Angst "perfected the band's aggressive fusion of pounding electro rhythms and screeching guitars." Angst was given a Silver Salute by CMJ New Music Report in 2003, with Brad Filicky saying, "KMFDM managed to make people laugh, even as they were checking under their beds for monsters and finding the inspiration to plug their guitars into a MIDI unit."

Track listing

Personnel

Musicians
Sascha Konietzko – vocals, bass, keyboards, programming
En Esch – vocals, guitars
Svet Am – guitars, piano ("The Problem")
Mark Durante – guitars

Additional personnel
Dorona Alberti – vocals ("Light", "Lust", "Move On", "No Peace", "The Problem")
Christine Siewert – vocals ("Blood (Evil Mix)")
Bruce Breckenfeld – Hammond B3 organ ("No Peace")

Production
Sascha Konietzko – production, arrangements
Chris Shepard – recording, engineering, mixing
Brian Gardner – digital editing
Konrad Strauss – mastering

References

External links
 KMFDM DØTKØM Angst lyrics at the official KMFDM website
 Angst at Discogs

1993 albums
KMFDM albums
TVT Records albums
Metropolis Records albums
Wax Trax! Records albums